Clathrogaster is a genus of fungi in the Hysterangiaceae family. Circumscribed by Lionello Petri in 1900, The genus contains two species found in Borneo.

References

Hysterangiales
Fungi of Asia
Agaricomycetes genera